Kadıncık is a Turkish word. It may refer to:

Kadıncık, Şereflikoçhisar, a village in Şereflikoçhisar district of Ankara Province, Turkey
Kadıncık 1 hydroelectric power plant, a power plant in Mersin Province, Turkey
Kadıncık 2 hydroelectric power plant, a power plant in Mersin Province, Turkey

Turkish words and phrases